Clionella bornii is a species of sea snail, a marine gastropod mollusk in the family Clavatulidae.

Description
The size of an adult shell varies between 25 mm and 40 mm.

(Freely translated from the original Latin description) The whitish shell is elongated and subturrited. The shell contains about 8 rather flat whorls (the apex is lacking). Just below the suture it shows a bipartite girdle. The space between the longitudinal ribs has a red color These interstices are as long as the ribs. The oblique ribs are numerous and increase from 11–12 on the early whorls to 18 on the body whorl, extending almost to the siphonal canal. The spiral striae show obsolete grooves and are best seen on the early whorls. The oval aperture has a length of about  the length of the shell. The aperture narrows to a slender point at its top. The very short siphonal canal is slightly curved to the left. The columella is slightly curved in the middle and almost twisted. The outer lip is narrow and shows a rather deep sinus.

This species is closely allied to the well-known Clionella sinuata. It differs, however, in being covered with a paler epidermis, in having below the suture a raised girdle formed by a depression or constriction around the whorls, and also in the style of coloration.

Distribution
This marine species occurs between Jeffrey's Bay and East London, South Africa

References

 E.A. Smith, Diagnoses of new Species of Pleurotomidae in the British Museum; The Annals and Magazine of Natural History: Including Zoology, Botany, and Geology. 1877, vol. xix. p. 499
 Kilburn, R.N. (1985). Turridae (Mollusca: Gastropoda) of southern Africa and Mozambique. Part 2. Subfamily Clavatulinae. Annals of the Natal Museum. 26(2), 417–470.

External links
 

Endemic fauna of South Africa
bornii
Gastropods described in 1877